You Can't Beat Tomorrow is the fifth album by The Howling Hex.  It was released as a CD and DVD by Drag City in 2005.

CD Track listing
"Teenage Doors" – 1:58
"Cobra Heart" – 2:30
"Apache Energy Plan" – 3:04
"S.C. Coward" – 2:58
"Sick & Old 1" – 2:54
"Diamond Tank" – 2:37
"You Can't Beat Tomorrow" – 2:17
"Meet Me at the Dance" – 3:57
"Sick & Old 2" – 1:39
"No Numbers" – 5:04

DVD
You Can't Beat Tomorrow: The Howling Hex Variety Show - 34:30

References

2005 albums
Howling Hex albums
Drag City (record label) albums